Chhavi Mittal Hussein (born 4 September 1980) is an Indian film and television actress. She co-founded Shitty Ideas Trending (SIT), a digital production company, along with her husband Mohit Hussein.

Personal life 
She married director Mohit Hussein in 2004. She is from a Hindu background while her husband is a Muslim. Initially, her parents disapproved her marriage but later on, they agreed. The couple is blessed with a daughter Areeza Hussain in 2012 and son Arham Hussein in 2019.

On 25th April, 2022 after getting diagnosed with breast cancer, she underwent breast cancer removal surgery.

Filmography

Television
 Sssshhh Phir Koi Hai 
 3 Bahuraaniya
 Tumhari Disha
 Ghar Ki Lakshmi Betiyann
 Bandini as Subhadra 
 Naaginn as Aastha
 Ek Chutki Aasman
 Twinkle Beauty Parlour
 Viraasat
Krishnadasi as Tulsi

Films
 Ek Vivaah... Aisa Bhi as Natasha
 Kaisey Kahein???

YouTube
 Shitty Ideas Trending 
 Being Woman with Chhavi

References

External links

Living people
Indian television actresses
1980 births